Chahar Meleh-ye Sofla (also Romanized as Chahār Meleh-ye Soflá; also known as Chahār Meleh-ye ‘Arab and Chahār Meleh-ye Pā’īn) is a village in Mansuri Rural District, Homeyl District, Eslamabad-e Gharb County, Kermanshah Province, Iran. At the 2006 census, its population was 163, in 35 families.

References 

Populated places in Eslamabad-e Gharb County